Harron is a surname, and may refer to:

Dawson Harron (1921-1988), British cricketer
Don Harron (1924-2015), Canadian actor, composer, and author
Gary Harron (contemporary), Canadian politician and government administrator from Ontario
John Harron (1903–1939), American actor; brother of Robert Harron and Mary Harron
Marion Janet Harron (1903-1972), U.S. judge
Mary Harron (b. 1953), Canadian film director and screenwriter
Mary Harron (actress), silent film era actress, sister of Harrons John and Robert also silent era actors
Maurice Harron (b. 1946), Northern Ireland sculptor
Robert Harron (1893–1920), American actor of the silent film era; brother of John Harron and Mary Harron

See also

 
 Herron (name)